Sinus Aestuum  (Latin sinus aestuum "Seething Bay") forms a northeastern extension to Mare Insularum. It is centered at selenographic coordinates 12.1° N, 8.3° W, and it lies within a diameter of about 320 km.

The Sinus Aestuum is a level, nearly featureless surface of low albedo basaltic lava that is marked by a few small impacts and some wrinkle ridges. The eastern border is formed by an area of irregular terrain that divides the bay from the Mare Vaporum to the east. To the north is the Montes Apenninus range and the prominent crater Eratosthenes. Along the western side is the flooded crater Stadius and the Mare Insularum to the southwest.

See also
Volcanism on the Moon

References

External links
 Sinus Aestuum at The Moon Wiki
 Maps with current names of surface features: western part, eastern part
 Images of Sinus Aestuum by Apollo 12
Images from the Lunar Reconnaissance Orbiter online with information about the image's location that was in and around Sinus Aestuum:
A Path Not Taken
DMD Excavations
Pyroclastic Trails
Striped Crater
 
 

Aestuum